Les Hussards, is a French comedy film from 1955, directed by Alex Joffé, written by Gabriel Arout, starring Bernard Blier, Giovanna Ralli, Bourvil, and with Georges Wilson, Virna Lisi, Louis de Funès playing supporting roles. The film is known under the titles "Cavalrymen" (international English title), "Les hussards" (Belgium French title), "De husaren" (Belgium Flemish title), "La piccola guerra" (Italy), "Huszárok" (Hungary).

Plot
During the Italian campaigns of the French Revolutionary Wars Brigadier Le Gouce and private Jean-Louis forfeit their horses. Afraid of a severe punishment both lie to Captain Georges. They just make up a story about them having been the target of a selective ambush. Little later their regiment is annihilated by an Austrian attack. Only the two humbuggers are lucky enough to survive. Napoleon has them celebrated as heroes and thus they get into the books of history.

Cast 
 Bernard Blier: Brigadier Le Gouce
 Giovanna Ralli: Cosima
 André Bourvil: private ("trumpeter") Jean-Louis
 Louis de Funès: Luigi, the sexton 
 Virna Lisi: Elisa
 Clélia Matania: Mrs Luppi
 Georges Wilson: Captain Georges
 Marcel Daxely: Giacomo, the shepherd
 Carlo Campanini: Mr Luppi
 Giani Esposito: Pietro
 Jean-Marie Amato: Carotti, the shoemaker
 Franco Pesce: the clergyman
 Alberto Bonnuci: Raphaël
 Jess Hahn: a hussar
 Albert Rémy: a hussar
 Maurice Chevit: hussar Camille
 Roger Hanin: a soldier
 Paul Préboist

References

External links 
 
 Les Hussards (1955) at the Films de France

1955 films
French comedy films
1950s French-language films
French black-and-white films
Films scored by Georges Auric
Films set in Italy
Films set in the 1790s
French Revolutionary Wars films
1955 comedy films
1950s French films